Mikhail Youzhny was the defending champion but chose not to defend his title.

Steve Darcis won the title after defeating Alex De Minaur 6–4, 6–2 in the final.

Seeds

Draw

Finals

Top half

Bottom half

References
Main Draw
Qualifying Draw

Bauer Watertechnology Cup - Singles